Matthew E. Bershadker was named president and CEO of American Society for the Prevention of Cruelty to Animals (ASPCA) in May 2013 and serves on the Global Animal Partnership's Board of Directors. He holds an MBA from Johns Hopkins Carey Business School and a Bachelor of Arts degree in communications from Ohio University. His annual salary as of 2017 was in excess of $600,000. The ASPCA donates on average, 7% of its collected donations in the form of grants to pet shelters, annually.

Prior to joining the ASPCA, Bershadker worked for ICF Consulting, Share our Strength and Rape, Abuse and Incest National Network

References

Year of birth missing (living people)
Living people
Johns Hopkins Carey Business School alumni
American nonprofit chief executives
American animal welfare workers
Ohio University alumni